Ekinchi may refer to:

Akinchi / Əkinçi, an Azeri-language newspaper published in 1875–1877
Ekinchi, shah of Khwarazm